The T 47 class or Surcouf class were the first destroyers built for the French Navy after the Second World War. Twelve ships were built between 1955 and 1957. The class was authorised in 1949 and were designed as aircraft carrier escort vessels. Three were modified to become flagships, four became anti-air guided missile destroyers and five became anti-submarine destroyers. One member of the class survives,  as a museum ship at Nantes.

Design and description

These ships were based on the wartime , but were enlarged and had a dual purpose armament. The ships were designed as Squadron escorts (Escorteur d'escadre) rather than for independent operations, therefore they had a slower speed than their predecessors. They carried  of fuel oil.

The class was initially designed for fleet anti-aircraft warfare (AA). The main guns were the dual-purpose French-designed Model 1948 /54 calibre gun, which enabled them to use standard U.S. ammunition. The main armament was mounted in three twin turrets. The secondary armament was composed of 57mm/60 modèle 1951 guns in three twin turrets and four single-mounted 20 mm Oerlikon cannon. Their heavy AA armament was chosen due to the lack of pre-war vessels with this ability. Originally, the ships did not have much anti-submarine warfare (ASW) armament included in the design beyond depth charge racks. The design initially included a single quadruple mount of  torpedo tubes mounted between the aft 127 mm and 57 mm gun mounts. This was changed to four triple banks of 550 mm torpedo tubes with two placed along either side of the ship. These forward pair were designed to fire L3 ASW homing torpedoes and the aft pair, either L3 torpedoes or K2 anti-ship torpedoes.

The ships were equipped with French sonars DUBV 1 and DUBA 1 mounted on the hull. They were intended to have a British-pattern lattice mast, but had twin tripods with lattice installed carrying a DRBV 11 surface and air search radar. They also carried DRBV 20A and DRBC 11 and DRBC 30 radars. The main armament was guided by a single fire control director, with a second slotted aft for the 57 mm guns. The ships had a complement of 347.

During the 1960s the entire class were modernised and modified as either flotilla flagships, anti-aircraft guided missile or anti-submarine destroyers.

Flagships
Three ships – Surcouf, Cassard, and Chevalier Paul – were converted into flotilla flagships (conducteurs de flottilles) between 1960 and 1962. One 57 mm gun turret, two triple torpedo launchers and two 20 mm guns were removed in order to enlarge the superstructure to accommodate an admiral, his staff, and additional communications equipment. They were modified as replacements for two light cruisers which had been withdrawn from service. In 1962, Cassard was used for helicopter experiments and fitted with a flight deck.

AAW modernisation

Four ships – Bouvet, Kersaint, Dupetit-Thouars and Du Chayla – were modernised as anti-aircraft guided missile destroyers in 1962–1965. They were given one Tartar missile launcher, retained their three twin turrets of 57 mm guns. They were also given one Model 1972 sextuple  anti-submarine mortar. The missile launcher replaced the aft 127 mm turrets and a raised deckhouse was installed between the aft 57 mm guns where SPG-51 tracker-illuminators were situated. The Model 1972 mortar replaced the forward 127 mm turret and the fire control director for the main armament was removed. The DRBC 31 radar was moved to the fire control director's former spot atop the bridge and the DRBV 11 radar was replaced by an SPS-39A 3D model, later upgraded to the B model. The complement was reduced to 278, comprising 17 officers and 261 ratings.

Further upgrades including  receiving a SENIT 2 action information centre within the bridge superstructure towards the aft and in 1979, two ships, Dupetit-Thouars and Du Chayla, had their DRBV 11 air search radar exchanged with a DRBV 22 system. Only the forward set of torpedo tubes were kept.

ASW modernisation

Five ships – D'Estrées, Maillé-Brézé, Vauquelin, Casabianca and Guépratte – were modernised as anti-submarine destroyers in 1968–1970. D'Estrées had served as the trial vessel for French variable depth sonar in the early 1960s. The armament was modified to two Mod 53  guns, one Mod 1972 375 mm sextuple anti-submarine rocket launcher, one Malafon anti-submarine missile launcher and two 20 mm guns. The Malafon system was installed aft with the magazine located directly in front of it. The single-mounted 100 mm guns were located fore and aft and were controlled by a DRBC 32A fire control director. The 375 mm ASW mortar was situated in the "B" position forward.

The ships were given DRBV 22A air search radar situated atop the tripod mast with the DRBV 50 air/surface radar located below it. The five destroyers were had DUBV 23 and DUBV 43 sonars installed, with the new sonars requiring that the bow be reconfigured. The complement was reduced to 260.

Ships

Service history

One ship was authorised under the 1949 building programme, one under the 1950, four in 1951 and eight in 1952. Bouvet, Kersaint, Dupetit-Thouars and Du Chayla all served with the Atlantic Squadron for their entire careers. Bouvet was taken out of service in 1982 and the ship's missile system was removed and installed on the new  . Kersaint was removed from service in 1983 and its missile system was installed aboard . The remaining two vessels remained in service until the Cassard class entered service in 1991. Kersaints hull was used for testing shipboard fires after the Falklands War.

D'Estrées, Maillé-Brézé, Vauquelin, Casabianca and Guépratte remained in service until the mid-1980s when they were replaced with the s. D'Estrées  and Guépratte were assigned to the Mediterranean Squadron while the other three served with the Atlantic Squadron. After being taken out of service in 1988, Maillé-Brézé was made a museum ship at Nantes.

See also
 List of Escorteurs of the French Navy

Notes

Bibliography

External links

 ex-Bouvet D624 waiting scrapping May 2012 on ShipSpotting.com

 
 
Destroyer classes
Ship classes of the French Navy